= DGCP =

DGCP may refer to:

- Dirección General de Centros Penales, a directorate of the Ministry of Justice and Public Security of El Salvador
- Distributed Generation Certified Professional, a certification of the Association of Energy Engineers
